Corinth is a ghost town in Winston County, Alabama, United States, formerly located  east-southeast of Double Springs.

References

Geography of Winston County, Alabama
Ghost towns in Alabama